Willard Van Dyke (December 5, 1906 – January 23, 1986) was an American filmmaker, photographer, arts administrator, teacher, and former director of the film department at the Museum of Modern Art. Van Dyke went to the University of California, dropping out for a time to avoid taking an ROTC course.

Van Dyke died on January 23, 1986, of a heart attack on his way to Cambridge, Massachusetts, where he was named laureate artist in residence at Harvard. He was 79 years old.

Photography
Van Dyke’s involvement with photography started when he was young. He recalled that "I had been playing around with a camera and developing my own pictures since I was 12 years of age." In 1928, he went to see a photographic exhibition at the Palace of the Legion of Honor in San Francisco, where he not only saw some Edward Weston’s work but met him. It was a life-changing experience.

In 1928, he apprenticed with Edward Weston and by 1932 co-founded Group f/64, with Imogen Cunningham, Ansel Adams, and Weston. The group’s approach emphasized both sharp and deep focus (sometimes called straight photography) in contrast with the painterly approach of many other photographers. 

In April 1934, the DeYoung Museum exhibited 70 photos taken by Van Dyke of Public Works of Art Project artworks.

Van Dyke soon abandoned still photography, saying in a 1982 documentary based on his life that he did not want to compete with his closest friend, Weston.

Film
Van Dyke's photographs were marked by a tendency to address social issues, as in portraits of migrant workers, as well as purely formal subjects. This interest apparently led him to documentary films. "The effects of the Depression were very disturbing to me, and I felt anxious to promote change," he once said to an interviewer. "I was young and impatient, and felt that the documentary film would more effectively communicate issues to more people than would still photography." (New York Times) He also suggested that he abandoned photography because he did not want to compete with his closest friend, Weston.

In 1935, Van Dyke moved to New York City and began making documentary films. He served as a cameraman on  The River (1938) directed by Pare Lorentz.  He also worked with NYKINO, the film organization that involved Paul Strand, Ralph Steiner, and Henri Cartier-Bresson. His film The City (1939) with Steiner, ran for two years at the New York World's Fair of 1939. During World War II, he worked the OWI Overseas Motion Picture Bureau, acting as liaison officer between the OWI and a Hollywood writers. In 1945, Van Dyke was commissioned to make an official film called San Francisco about the conference that created the United Nations Organization.

From 1946 to 1965, he was a producer/director of films for television and in the field of adult education. He directed films for the CBS Television programs, The Twentieth Century and The Twenty-First Century. In 1948, Van Dyke made the documentary film The Photographer about Edward Weston. In 1960, he was nominated with Shirley Clarke and Irving Jacoby for an Academy Award for the short documentary film Skyscraper (1959).

The Academy Film Archive has preserved a few of Willard Van Dyke's films, including The 21st Century/The Shape of Films To Come, Journey Into Medicine, and The American Scene Number 6: Steel Town.

Arts administrator and teacher

Van Dyke was director of the Department of Film at the Museum of Modern Art from 1965 to 1974, overseeing the expansion of the department's archives and exhibitions, and he started two programs for showing the work of avant-garde and documentary film makers.  He introduced the work of modern and fellow documentary photographers and was credited with enhancing photography's position as a serious art form. While director of the Department of Film, Mr. Van Dyke served as president of the Robert Flaherty International Film Seminars, as chairman of the faculty at the first cinema session of the Salzburg Seminar in American Studies, and as vice-president of the International Federation of Film Archives (FIAF). From 1976 he was a trustee and chairman of the Film Advisory Committee of the American Federation of Arts.

After leaving the Museum of Modern Art in 1977, he became a professor at the State University of New York at Purchase, and founded its film program and remained there until 1981. In 1978, Van Dyke was awarded the George Eastman Award, given by George Eastman House for distinguished contribution to the art of film.

Film credits
Director

1934 Hands (short) 
1939 The City (documentary short) 
1940 Valley Town (documentary) 
1940 The Children Must Learn (documentary) 
1940 Design for Education (documentary) 
1941 Tall Tales (documentary short) 
1947 To Hear Your Banjo Play (short) 
1947 Journey Into Medicine (documentary) 
1948 The Photographer (documentary short) 
1950 Choosing for Happiness (short) 
1950 This Charming Couple (short)
1953 American Frontier (short)
1960 Skyscraper (short, co-directed with Shirley Clarke)
1961-1965 The Twentieth Century (TV series documentary – 5 episodes)
1963 So That Men Are Free  (documentary)

Cinematographer

1938 The River (documentary short)
1943 This Is Tomorrow (documentary short)
1954 The Lonely Night (documentary)
 
Producer

1947 To Hear Your Banjo Play (short) (co-producer)
1948 The Photographer (documentary short) (producer)
1953 American Frontier (short) (producer)
1954 The Lonely Night (documentary) (producer)
1976 Nanook of the North (documentary) (supervisor: International Film Seminars)

References
Calmes, Leslie Squyres (text)
1992	The Letters between Edward Weston & Willard Van Dyke. Archive 30.  The Center for Creative Photography, Tucson, 67 pp., a few black-and-white illustrations, 8½x11".

Enyeart, James L.
2008	Willard Van Dyke: Changing the World Through Photography and Film. Albuquerque, University of New Mexico Press.

Rothschild, Amalie
1981 Conversations With Willard Van Dyke. New Day Films.

External links
Finding aid for the Willard Van Dyke archive, Center for Creative Photography, University of Arizona

American film directors
20th-century American photographers
1906 births
1986 deaths
People associated with the Museum of Modern Art (New York City)
State University of New York at Purchase faculty